Five ships of the United States Navy have been named USS Idaho in honor of the 43rd state.

  was a wooden steam sloop later converted to a full-rigged sailing ship
  was a motor boat acquired by the US Navy in June 1917 and returned to her owner 30 November 1918
  was a  launched on 30 June 1917, saw action in World War II, and was sold for scrap 24 November 1947
  is a Virginia-class submarine currently authorized for construction

See also
 , an auxiliary  launched in 1965 currently in ready reserve since 1984.

United States Navy ship names